Time in Vanuatu is given by Vanuatu Time (VUT; UTC+11:00). Vanuatu does not currently observe daylight saving time. Vanuatu previously observed DST (UTC+12:00) between 1 September 1983 until 1993.

IANA time zone database
In the IANA time zone database, Vanuatu is given one time zone:

References

External links
Time in Vanuatu at Lonely Planet
Current time in Vanuatu at Time.is